Minet el-Beida (The White Harbor; or ancient Ma'hadu) is a small bay located  north of Latakia, Syria on the Mediterranean Sea.

History
It is an important archaeological site because it served as the harbor town and necropolis for Ugarit.

Gallery

See also
Cities of the ancient Near East

References

Bibliography

Former populated places in Syria
Bays of Syria
Ugarit
Archaeological sites in Latakia Governorate
Ports and harbours of Syria
Ports and harbours of the Arab League
Transport in the Arab League
Bronze Age sites in Syria